Jelian or Jelyan or Jalyan or Jalian or Jaleyan may refer to:
 Jelian, Fasa
 Jelyan, Marvdasht